The Bartered Bride is a 1932 German musical comedy film directed by Max Ophüls and starring Jarmila Novotná, Otto Wernicke, and Karl Valentin. It is based on the comic opera of the same name by Czech composer Bedřich Smetana.

It was shot at the Bavaria Studios in Munich. The film's sets were designed by the art director Erwin Scharf.

Plot
The Bartered Bride is the comic misadventure of two mismatched couples.

1859 at a church consecration festival in Bohemia. The matchmaker Kezal wants to match the mayor's daughter Marie to Wenzel, the son of rich Micha. However, Marie falls in love with the post coach Hans and hides with him in the hustle and bustle of the church consecration festival.

Meanwhile, the traveling circus Brummer has arrived, and Wenzel has his eye on the artist Esmeralda, circus director Brummer's foster daughter. Marie and Wenzel's parents are dissatisfied with this development. So, Marie is locked in her room and the mayor does not give the circus permission to perform.

Kezal offers Hans 300 guilders if he gives up Marie, and when he accepts the money, word gets around that he has sold his bride. The humiliated Marie is now ready to marry Wenzel. But Hans only accepted the money because the circus needed it to be able to play. When a circus bear escapes and Hans saves Marie from the bear, everything comes back into order. The parents agree, Wenzel gets Esmeralda, and even Kezal is reimbursed twice for his expenses.

Cast

Soundtrack 
 "Overture"
 Otto Wernicke, Paul Kemp, Max Nadler and Maria Janowska - "Alles ist so gut wie richtig"
 "Das ist treue Liebe"
 Jarmila Novotná and Willy Domgraf-Fassbaender - "Fliesse, Wasser, Fliesse
 Chorus - "Bohemian Folk Dance"
 Jarmila Novotná - "Jungfrau Maria"
 Jarmila Novotná and Willy Domgraf-Fassbaender - "Heut Bin Ich Dein, Jetzt Bist Du Mein"
 Jarmila Novotná - "Wenn Du gehts, Ich Will nicht Klagen"
 Otto Wernike and Willy Domgraf-Fassbaender - "Ohne Dukaten bist Du verraten"
 Otto Wernicke, chorus and Jarmila Novotná - "Ruhe, Ruhe nur Geduld"
 Chorus - "Er verkaufte seine Braut"
 Annemarie Sörensen - "Alles geht am Schuerchen"
 "Prodaná nevesta" (Written by Bedřich Smetana)

External links 

1932 films
1932 musical comedy films
German musical comedy films
Films of the Weimar Republic
1930s German-language films
Films directed by Max Ophüls
German black-and-white films
Films based on operas
Circus films
Films set in the 1850s
Films set in the Czech Republic
Films set in Austria
Bohemia in fiction
Bavaria Film films
Films shot at Bavaria Studios
1930s historical comedy films
German historical comedy films
1930s historical musical films
German historical musical films
Opera films
1930s German films